USS Orion is a name used more than once by the U.S. Navy:

 , a wooden schooner used as part of the Stone Fleet of the Union Navy during the American Civil War.
 , a single-turreted, twin-screw monitor of the Union Navy during the American Civil War, the name used only briefly (2 months) following the original vessel name USS Chimo (1864). The vessel was later named the Piscataqua (1869).
 , a collier commissioned at Norfolk, Virginia, 29 July 1912.
 , a submarine tender commissioned 30 September 1943.

See also
 Orion was the name of the Lunar Module on Apollo 16
 Project Orion (nuclear propulsion), proposed U.S. spaceship-type
 , various ships named Orion

Fictional vessels
 Orion (Stargate), fictional USS Orion from the science-fiction TV-series Stargate: Atlantis

References 

United States Navy ship names